Boloria titania, the Titania's fritillary or purple bog fritillary, is a butterfly of the subfamily Heliconiinae of the family Nymphalidae.

Description
The adult is a small fritillary with typically chequered orange-brown upperside and a marginal row of triangles and dots. The length of the forewings is 21–23 mm. 
The underside has brown pearly spots and triangular markings at the edge of the hindwings.

Description in Seitz
A. amathusia Esp. (= diana Hbn., titania Esp., dia major Esp.) (68e). Above similar to large specimens of  euphrasyne. The hindwing beneath very characteristic, being strongly variegated with purple, its distal band deeply dentate on both sides and bearing purple-brown partly pale-centred dots. In the nymotypical form the forewing beneath also shows at the distal margin pointed teeth which project far on to the disc...  In the Alps. — bivina Fruhst. is the eastern European form; smaller, paler, with somewhat thinner lilac markings; darker beneath, the median band of the hindwing more uniformly yellow, not being variegated with red; from Saratow. — In sibirica Stgr. (68f) the band occupying the distal area much less deeply and more evenly indented on both sides; from the mountains of South-West Siberia.

Distribution
This species is present in the Palearctic realm from central Europe to Siberia and the Altai. In Europe it forms small isolates in the Alps, southern Finland, Latvia, Poland, and the Balkans.

Subspecies
 Clossiana titania titania
 Clossiana titania bivina (Fruhstorfer, 1908) central and southern Europe
 Clossiana titania miyakei (Matsumura, 1919) Sakhalin, Amur
 Clossiana titania staudingeri (Wnukowsky, 1929) southern Siberia

Biology
The butterfly flies in subalpine meadows from June to August depending on the location. The larvae feed on Viola species, Vaccinium uliginosum, Bistorta major, Filipendula ulmaria and Trollius asiaticus.

References

 Guide des papillons d'Europe et d'Afrique du Nord, Delachaux et Niestlé, Tom Tolman, Richard Lewington

External links
Butterflies of Europe 
 euro butterflies
 butterfly guide

Boloria
Palearctic Lepidoptera
Butterflies described in 1793